The Clements House, located west of Springfield, Kentucky on U.S. Route 150, was listed on the National Register of Historic Places in 1989.

It is a five-bay brick two-story building with brick laid in Flemish bond.  Some elements of Greek Revival style are present.

Dinner was served to soldiers before the Battle of Perryville, according to the owners in 1983.

References

Houses on the National Register of Historic Places in Kentucky
Greek Revival houses in Kentucky
National Register of Historic Places in Washington County, Kentucky
Houses in Washington County, Kentucky